Voron is a village in the Sudak Municipality of the Crimea, a territory recognized by a majority of countries as part of Ukraine and annexed by Russia as the Republic of Crimea.

Its population was 202 in the 2001 Ukrainian census. Current population:

References

External links
 

Villages in Crimea
Sudak Municipality
Feodosiysky Uyezd